Mitare is a community located in northern Falcón state, Venezuela.

References 

Populated places in Falcón